Team One is a comic book team from DC Comics/Wildstorm.

It was published as two separate but intertwined two-issue mini-series, each focusing on different members of the same team and showing events from their different perspectives. Team One: WildC.A.T.s focused on members who were involved with the WildC.A.T.s series, while Team One: Stormwatch focused on members who were involved with the Stormwatch series.

History
Team One was formed in the 1960s through the secret efforts of Lord Emp, then called Saul Baxter. For nearly 50 years, Daemonite activity had been non-existent, but a sudden flurry of attacks aimed at U.S. military bases worried Baxter that a new offensive was coming. Using his influence within the military-industrial complex, he arranged for the formation of a team to handle the oncoming threat. Enter Miles Craven. As head of the newly formed International Operations, he was chosen to act as the visible head of the team; Baxter's true level of involvement was to remain a secret.

Through a combination of Baxter's influence and contacts among the Kherubim and Craven's involvement with a number of secret military projects, the team was created and dubbed Team One.

On their first mission, the group was mobilized to deal with the takeover of a nuclear missile silo by the combined forces of the superpowered crime lord "Slaughterhouse" Smith and Helspont. The personnel of the silo were all swiftly killed. The duo had intended to hold the country for ransom, threatening to launch the missiles if they weren't paid on time. Trouble arises when Smith realizes that Helspont really intends to destroy New York, which Smith has a weak spot for. Helspont double-crosses him anyway.

Team One arrives and battles the enemy. Further trouble ensues when one of the team loses their nerve and freezes up in the midst of battle.

While the exact details of the battle's climax aren't known, the outcome is. Regiment died when the missile he was holding onto exploded and John Colt asks Majestic to kill him since he feared that his dark side could emerge. Majestic began his apparent sabbatical at the North Pole, Mason was later killed by the villain Kenyan (an enemy of Saul Baxter/Jacob Marlowe) and Team One was disbanded.

Members
Mr. Majestic
Saul Baxter (Lord Emp)
Marc Slayton (Backlash)
John Colt (Spartan)
Lucy Blaize (Zealot)
Think Tank (Henry Bendix)
Isaiah King (Despot)
Mason
Regiment

1995 comics debuts
WildStorm superhero teams
WildStorm limited series